Kalungu is a town in Kalehe Territory, South Kivu province of the Democratic Republic of the Congo (DRC).

Kalungu is a business center. Kalungu is located on the Goma-Bukavu highway. Located in the eastern Democratic Republic of Congo. Kalungu has known all sort of wars caused by armed groups in the DRC. A recent war, waged by Nkunda and Mutebusi, destroyed Kalungu center and caused its people to flee to neighboring villages like Bwisha, Mpumbi, Makelele Nyamasasa, Ruhunde, and Nyakalende on the shores of Lake Kivu.

The main language spoken in Kalungu is Kihavu followed by Kiswahili and Kitembo as well as French.

Populated places in South Kivu